Lamfalussy may refer to:
 Baron Alexandre Lamfalussy (1929-2015), a European economist and central banker.
 Lamfalussy process, an approach to the development of financial service industry regulations used by the European Union.